The University of Montenegro is a national public university of Montenegro.

Its central administration and majority of constitutive faculties are located in the country's capital Podgorica, with dislocated faculties in Nikšić, Cetinje and Kotor. Institution was founded in 1974 and it is currently organized in 19 faculties.

History
The University of Montenegro was founded on 29 April 1974 in Titograd, SR Montenegro (now Podgorica). In that year the following organisations signed the Agreement on Association into the University of Titograd: 
 three faculties: Faculty of Economics, Faculty of Engineering and the Faculty of Law from the capital Titograd, 
 two colleges: Teaching College from Nikšić and Maritime Studies College from Kotor, 
 three independent scientific institutes: for History, for Agriculture and for Biological and Medical Research, all from Titograd.

A year after it was founded, the institution changed its name to Veljko Vlahović University in honour of the communist activist and World War II participant from Montenegro who died that year. 1970's was a decade of exponential rise in number of higher education institutions in the former Yugoslavia when alongside Titograd universities in Osijek, Rijeka, Split, Banja Luka, Mostar, Maribor, Bitola, Kragujevac and Tuzla all opened their doors. In 1992, the university was given its current name - University of Montenegro.

Organization
The seat of the university is in Podgorica, the capital city of Montenegro, with a population of around 190,000. Most faculties of the University of Montenegro are located in Podgorica, while some faculties have been opened in Nikšić, Cetinje and Kotor.

The university comprises faculties, institutes and colleges, as well as logistic centers. The Managing Board governs the university and the Rector manages it. The supreme academic body is the University Senate. Deans are heads of faculties and directors are heads of institutes. At faculties i.e. at institutes, the highest academic bodies are councils for teaching-scientific issues, i.e. for teaching-artistic issues.

The highest student body is the Student Parliament. Representatives of students are elected in all bodies of the university and of the faculties.

Faculties
The university comprises following 19 faculties in 4 cities:

Podgorica
Faculty of Architecture
 Faculty of Biotechnology
 Faculty of Civil Engineering
 Faculty of Economics
 Faculty of Electrical Engineering
 Faculty of Law
 Faculty of Mechanical Engineering
 Faculty of Medicine
 Faculty of Metallurgy and Technology
 Faculty of Natural Sciences and Mathematics
 Faculty of Political Sciences

Nikšić
 Faculty of Philosophy 
 Faculty of Philology 
 Faculty for Sport and Physical Education 
Cetinje
 Faculty of Drama
 Faculty of Fine Arts 
 Music Academy 
Kotor
 Faculty of Maritime Studies 
 Faculty of Tourism and Hotel Management 

Within the faculties, there are departments and study groups.

The university includes three scientific research institutes:
 Institute for History
 Institute of Marine Biology
 Institute- Center of Excellence in Research and Innovation

Teaching and learning

In 2017, the University of Montenegro reformed the system of studies and adopted the new system of 3+2+3 instead of the previous 3+1+1+3 system. With the accreditation from 2017, 160 study programmes are accredited on all study levels, of which 114 are at bachelor and postgraduate studies, 14 within the applied studies, and 25 doctoral study programmes. Also, eight interdisciplinary study programmes are accredited, of which one is at the doctoral level, while seven exist at the level of postgraduate master studies. All the bachelor study programmes are accredited as three-year study programmes, while having, at the most, two modules in their VI semester. They are organized as either academic or applied studies. Their scope is 180 ECTS. Exempted from this rule are the regulated professions, which have implemented the EU directives about the duration of their bachelor studies, so that bachelor studies in medicine and dentistry last 6 years, while pharmacology and architecture last five years.

The postgraduate study programmes are organized after the completion of the bachelor studies and all are accredited as two-year programmes. The scope of the postgraduate studies is 120 ECTS.

Doctoral studies are organized after postgraduate studies, and all are accredited as three-year study programmes. The scope of doctoral studies is 180 ECTS.

See also 
 List of colleges and universities
 List of universities in Montenegro

References

External links
 University of Montenegro official website
 University of Montenegro Student Parliament

 
Education in Podgorica
1974 establishments in Montenegro
Educational institutions established in 1974